Mersin İdmanyurdu (also Mersin İdman Yurdu, Mersin İY, or MİY) Sports Club; located in Mersin, east Mediterranean coast of Turkey in 1965–1966.  The 1965–66 season was the 3rd season of Mersin İdmanyurdu football team in Second League, the second level division in Turkey.

The club had had name "Çukurova İdmanyurdu" again under Çukurova Group sponsorship and finished 5th. On 20 July 1965 the club and fans celebrated the 40th anniversary of their foundation. Executive committee comprised Mehmet Karametmet, Halit Gazioğlu, Sezai Sak.

At the beginning of the season Fahrettin Cansever was the coach of the team. In the half season Lefter Küçükantonyadis became the manager of the team (20 January 1966). Lefter signed for four months. One month later, Lefter had been stabbed by a fan (a restaurant owner, Fikri Özkörüklü) and hospitalized. Many citizens, pupils, NGO representatives and sports people visited him in hospital and his room was filled with flowers. Lefter declared that he will not leave the team. Fahrettin Cansever became the trainer of Beykozspor (12 January 1966). On 7 June 1966 before the last match of the season, Lefter left Mersin. He said that he was compliant of the behaviours of executive committee member Sezai Sak.

Pre-season
 Preparation game: ÇİY-Türkocağı: 4–1.
 Spor-Toto Cup: 15 August 1965 - Adana Demirspor-ÇİY: 0–2. Sunday, 17:00. City Stadium, Adana. Goals: Mehmet.
 Spor-Toto Cup: 22 August 1965 - ÇİY-Adana Demirspor: 0–0. Sunday. Mersin.
 Preparation game: 29 September 1965. ÇİY-Adana Milli Mensucat. Sunday.

1965–66 Second League participation
Second League 1965–66 was played by 22 teams in two groups (red and white), 11 in each. Top four teams played promotion group matches in league format. Bottom teams played relegation play-out. Top two teams promoted to First League 1966–67.

Results summary
Mersin İdmanyurdu (MİY) 1965–66 Second League summary:

Sources: 1965–66 Turkish Second Football League pages.

Ranking group performance
The 1965–66 season Red Group (stage 1) matches of Çukurova İdmanyurdu (ÇİY) vs other team are shown in league table below.

Two points for a win. Rules for classification: 1) points; 2) goal difference; 3) number of goals scored. First team is ÇİY in both cases, home and away.
(Q): Qualified for Final Group; (R): Relegated to Regional Amateur League after relegation play-outs. 
Sources: 1965–66 Turkish Second Football League Cem Pekin Archives; and advanced searched performed in Milliyet online archive for 1965–66 Mersin İdmanyurdu season.

Ranking group games

Sources: Cem Pekin Archives, Milliyet Online Archive, Maçkolik, Erbil (1975).

Final group performance
The 1965–66 season promotion group (stage 2) matches of Çukurova İdmanyurdu (ÇİY) vs other team are shown in league table below.

Two points for a win. Rules for classification: 1) points; 2) goal difference; 3) number of goals scored. First team is ÇİY in both cases, home and away.
(P): Promoted to 1966–67 Turkish First Football League.
Sources: 1965–66 Turkish Second Football League Cem Pekin Archives; and advanced searched performed in Milliyet online archive for 1965–66 Mersin İdmanyurdu season.

Final group games

Sources: Cem Pekin Archives, Milliyet Online Archive, and Maçkolik.

1965–66 Turkish Cup participation
1965–66 Turkish Cup was the fourth cup and played by 71 teams: 16 First League teams (1), 20 Second League teams (2), 19 teams from regional leagues (R), and 16 amateur teams (A). Galatasaray has won the cup for the fourth time consecutively and became eligible for playing ECW next year. ÇİY and Yeşildirek were penalized due to last season draw outs. So ÇİY couldn't participated in fourth cup.

Management

Club management
Executive committee:
President: Halit Gazioğlu. Deputy President: Mehmet Mehmetoğlu. General Secretary: Aydın Özlü. Members: Mahir Turan, Erol Tarhan, Sezai Sak, Victor Venüs, Sedat Gülergün.

Coaching team
Head Coach: Fahrettin Cansever.

1965–66 Mersin İdmanyurdu head coaches:

Note: Only official games were included.

1965–66 squad
Stats are counted for 1965–66 Second League matches. In the team rosters four substitutes were allowed to appear, two of whom were substitutable. Only the players who appeared in game rosters were included and listed in the order of appearance.

Source: 1964–65 season squad data from maçkolik com, Milliyet, and Erbil (1975).

See also
 Football in Turkey
 1965–66 Turkish Second Football League
 1965–66 Turkish Cup

Notes and references

Mersin İdman Yurdu seasons
Turkish football clubs 1965–66 season